The Party for the Organization of a Free Brittany was a Breton political party that advocated political sovereignty for Brittany. Its initials "POBL" form a backronym, as the word pobl in Breton means "people" or "community".

Already a right-wing party at its foundation, it progressively drifted toward the far-right and two of its members were involved in an altercation with leftist militants of the Union Démocratique Bretonne at the Festival Interceltique de Lorient in 1999.

Never very influential, the party was crippled by the departure of most of its cadres for Adsav in 2000 and ceased its activities. What remained of it merged with other minor organisations to form the Ligue fédéraliste de Bretagne.

1982 establishments in France
2000 disestablishments in France
Breton nationalist parties
Defunct far-right parties
Defunct nationalist parties
Defunct political parties in France
Far-right political parties in France
Political parties disestablished in 2000
Political parties established in 1982
Political parties in Brittany